Pierre Andre (born Philip Litman, November 25, 1899 – July 21, 1962) was an announcer in the era of old-time radio.

Early years
Born in Duluth, Minnesota, Andre was the son of Mr. and Mrs. Rae Litman. He won competitions in public speaking and dramatics while he was a student at the University of Minnesota. After college, he worked as an actor and a newspaperman.

Radio
Andre's initial performance on radio, at WEBC in Duluth, Minnesota, resulted from his being invited to speak over the microphone at a studio party. His obituary in the Chicago Tribune reported, "His performance was so good that he immediately was engaged as an announcer." He went from WEBC to KSTP in St. Paul, where he worked for two years. He changed his name when he began working at KSTP.

Andre began working at WGN in Chicago, Illinois, on August 4, 1930, and stayed there for the rest of his career, with much of his work also being broadcast nationally via network connections. He was one of the early announcers for soap operas when they began to become staples of daytime radio.

His obituary noted that he "introduced the first of the remote dance band broadcasts, the Midnight Flyers program from the Blackhawk restaurant." It also reported that he adapted to different types of programming as old-time radio formats disappeared, being replaced by talk shows and other genres.

Programs on which Andre was heard nationally as an announcer included Little Orphan Annie, Arnold Grimm's Daughter, Betty and Bob, Backstage Wife, Carters of Elms Street, Easy Aces, Sky King, Captain Midnight, How's the Family? and The Romance of Helen Trent.

Death
Andre died of lympho-sarcoma on July 21, 1962, in Evanston, Illinois aged 62. He was survived by his wife, a son, a brother and a sister.

In popular culture
In the 1983 film A Christmas Story, Andre is mentioned (and heard) as the announcer for Little Orphan Annie.

References

1899 births
1962 deaths
People from Duluth, Minnesota
University of Minnesota alumni
Radio and television announcers
Radio personalities from Chicago
Radio personalities from Minnesota
Deaths from cancer in Illinois